Liaquat Ali Jatoi (born 5 January 1948) is a Pakistani politician who was Chief Minister of Sindh during 1997–1998.

Political career
Liaquat Jatoi was first elected to the National Assembly in 1977. However, this Assembly was dissolved by General  Muhammad Zia-ul-Haq within a few weeks of the elections. During Muhammad Zia-ul-Haq's rule, Jatoi served as member of the Federal Council (Majlis-e-Shoora) in 1980–81.

Jatoi later on participated in the elections of 1985, 1990 and 1997, when he was elected to the Sindh Assembly as a Member.  In 1990, he was chosen as the Provincial Minister for Finance, Excise and Taxation, Government of Sindh. This was the beginning of his alliance with Pakistan Muslim League (N) headed by Nawaz Sharif.

After the elections of 1997, Liaquat Ali Jatoi was chosen as the Chief Minister of Sindh. He served in this position until the end of October 1998, when Governor's Rule was imposed in Sindh due to the law and order situation.

In 2002, Jatoi was elected to the National Assembly and was inducted into the Federal Cabinet as a Minister.  Initially he held the portfolio of Minister of Industries, and was later on made the Minister for Water and Power.

Dadu District emerged in the period of 1998–2007, with Jatoi having no defeat in the history of his politics. However, in 2007, when Benazir Bhutto was assassinated, protests took place all over Sindh and Jatoi's house in Dadu was set on fire by the Pakistan Peoples Party activists. Jatoi lost his seat to the Pakistan Peoples Party, due to the sympathy of the people of Sindh on the assassination of Mohtarma Benazir Bhutto.

During the exile period of Nawaz Sharif, Liaquat Jatoi formed Sindh Awami Ittehad and merged the party with Pakistan Muslim League (N) when Sharif was back in Pakistan.

However, in the General Elections of 2013, Jatoi contested elections on the ticket of Pakistan Muslim League (N), where he was defeated by a massive margin of 45000 votes by the son of former PPP Federal Minister, Haji Zafar Ali Khan Laghari, Imran Zafar Laghari.

In April 2017, Jatoi joined the Pakistan Tehreek-e-Insaf political party.

Footnotes 

 

Chief Ministers of Sindh
1948 births
Baloch politicians
Cadet College Petaro alumni
Living people
People from Dadu District
University of Sindh alumni
Pakistan Muslim League (Q) politicians
Pakistan Muslim League (N) politicians
Pakistan Tehreek-e-Insaf politicians
Sindh MPAs 1997–1999
Liaquat Ali